Daniel Walter Nebert is an American physician-scientist. He is a professor emeritus at the University of Cincinnati College of Medicine.  His research has revolved around the central theme of gene–environment interaction.

Education
Nebert completed a BA degree at Wesleyan University in 1960.  He went on to the five-year program at the University of Oregon Medical School; he completed a MS in biophysics and a MD in 1964.  Nebert had a pediatric internship and residency at the University of California, Los Angeles Health Sciences Center from 1964–1966.  He was a postdoctoral fellow at the National Cancer Institute from 1966 to 1968.

Career 
Nebert moved to the NICHD in 1968. He remained there until 1989, and served as section head and the chief of the Laboratory of Developmental Pharmacology.

Nebert then moved to the University of Cincinnati Medical Center in December 1989, where he was hired as a professor of environmental health.  He also had an adjunct professor title in the Human Genetics Division, Department of Pediatrics and Molecular & Developmental Biology at Cincinnati Children's Hospital Medical Center beginning in 1991.  He remained at the University of Cincinnati until retiring as a professor emeritus in 2013.

Nebert has published more than 650 papers in several scientific fields. In October 2020, Nebert’s Google Scholar h-index was 125 with more than 67,000 citations.

Awards and honors

Nebert was elected a Fellow of the American Association for the Advancement of Science in 1994, as a member of the medical sciences section.

References

External links
 

Living people
1938 births
Wesleyan University alumni
Scientists from Portland, Oregon
University of Oregon alumni
American molecular biologists
20th-century American physicians
21st-century American physicians
American geneticists
University of Cincinnati faculty